Riet or RIET may refer to:

Riet, Germany, a village in Baden-Württemberg, Germany
Riet, Switzerland, a settlement in the municipality of Neftenbach in the Swiss canton of Zürich
Rajasthan Institute of Engineering and Technology, in India